Inhamitanga is a town in Cheringoma District in Sofala Province of Mozambique.

Transport 

It is served by a station on the Mozambique Railway system, where it is a junction.

Inhamitanga is connected by an unpaved road R1002 with Chupanga.

See also 

 Transport in Mozambique
 Railway stations in Mozambique

References 

Populated places in Sofala Province